Lidingöbron (Swedish: "The Lidingö Bridge") is the name of two existing and two historical bridges across the strait of Lilla Värtan between the mainland Norra Djurgården at Ropsten, at the eastern part of Stockholm, and the island of Lidingö.

History

First pontoon bridge
At a parish meeting in 1802, the inhabitants of Lidingö, at the time a mostly agricultural district, decided to open a venture to realize a pontoon bridge connecting the island to Stockholm. It had a hard time surviving the annual ice break-up, and a third of it was demolished in 1811, and most of it in 1858 — each time raising the price for milk in the capital, as most of it was produced on Lidingö at the time.

Second pontoon bridge
This bridge was located near the present bridge. The level of the roadway was only  over the water surface however, so even moderate winds made crossing the bridge a tough experience. The lateral stability of the bridge was ensured by means of logs attached to the bridge every  and anchored to the bottom. The use of logs instead of chains effectively increased the bridge's general buoyancy at the cost of its stability during low tide - the bridge often serpentined its way across the water while the inclination of the roadway at the two ends made use of extra horses necessary. Heavy trucks started to use the bridge, for which it was not constructed. Ice break-up destroyed a third of the bridge in 1918.

Old Lidingöbron
It had two railway tracks in the same carriageway as the road.

After the new bridge was built, cars were no longer allowed on the old bridge. It has one rail track which is now considered a tramway (or light rail line), the Lidingöbanan. The other half of the bridge is used for bicycles and pedestrians.

New Lidingöbron
The population of Lidingö as well as the traffic continued to grow however, and by the 1950s the old bridge had become insufficient. The two municipalities met in 1961, and the following year it was settled a new bridge should be located south of the old.

Image gallery

Sources
Lidingöbron in Swedish.

Footnotes

See also
 List of bridges in Stockholm

Bridges in Stockholm
Bridges completed in 1803
Bridges completed in 1884
Bridges completed in 1925
Bridges completed in 1971
Former toll bridges in Sweden
Rail infrastructure in Stockholm County